Isa Town (Madīnat ʿĪsā) is a middle class town located in Bahrain, in the north central part of the country.

Etymology
The name Isa refers to Isa ibn Salman Al Khalifah, the ruler of Bahrain from 1961 to 1999.

History
Isa Town largely comprises affluent newly constructed villas, and is home to many members of Bahrain's educated middle classes. In 2002's election it was one of the few areas of Bahrain not to be entirely represented by an Islamist or right wing MP, with Abdnabi Salman of the formerly communist Democratic Bloc winning the seat. In 2006's election, ex-Harvard academic, Dr Munira Fakhro of Waad lost in controversial circumstances to Sunni Islamist Dr Salah Ali of Al-Menbar Islamic Society.

It was one of the twelve municipalities of Bahrain after being split off of the municipality of al Mintaqah al Wusta in 1988, and is now part of the Central Governorate.

Notable sites
Isa Town is famous for the traditional marketplace. Isa Town also houses most of the private schools in Bahrain, with the Indian School, The New Indian School, Pakistan Urdu School, Sacred Heart School, Ibn Khuldoon National School, Pakistan School, The Bahrain Bayan School, the Naseem International School and the St. Christopher's School, all concentrated into a small zone which also includes the Isa Town campus of the University of Bahrain. The National Driving School and the Directorate of Road Traffic have their headquarters in Isa Town. Other offices include the Ministry of Education and the Ministry of Information, which includes the Bahrain Radio & TV broadcasting station, in Isa Town. Besides the market, the main landmark is the Bahrain National Stadium. The new Bahrain Polytechnic has also opened on the site of the old Bahrain University.

Pakistan School, Bahrain 

Pakistan School, Bahrain (PSB) is a Pakistan International School located in Isa Town, Bahrain. The school was founded in July 1968 by a group of overseas Pakistanis. Originally the school was housed at a rented building in Manama with 100 students. With a gradual increase in enrollment, the need to construct a school building was deemed necessary, to provide all modern educational facilities. At the request of the managing committee of the school, the Kingdom of Bahrain leased land in Isa Town for the construction of the school. The Minister of Education Ali M. Fakhro, laid the foundation stone of the school on 10 January 1983 while H.E Salman, Crown Prince of Bahrain performed the inauguration of the building on 23 March 1985. The building was again expanded and on 25 September 1993, Jinnah Block was inaugurated. On 5 June 1995, Dr. Abdul Qadeer Khan inaugurated Sir Syed Block.

Isa Town Market inferno
On 15 July 2012, the Isa Town marketplace caught fire, damaging more than 450 shops and causing damages amounting to hundreds of thousands of dinars. It took dozens of firefighters and around 30 fire engines more than five hours to control the blaze. There were no reported casualties although two firemen were hospitalized due to smoke inhalation. It was estimated that two-thirds of the market was destroyed.

Bahrain's Prime Minister, Khalifa bin Salman al-Khalifa, ordered a probe to be set up to investigate the incident.

Healthcare
Alwalil Hospital Bahrain partners with Prime Sports & Medical Agency of England for recruitment of Nurses, Radiologist, and Laboratory Technician and Medical Assistance for Employment

Notable residents
Saudi singer, Rashed Al-Majed, the Bahraini guitarist Khalid Al-Thawadi and the Brothers Band drummer, Wajeeh Hassan live in Madinat Isa.

References

 
Populated places in the Central Governorate, Bahrain
Former municipalities (regions) of Bahrain